Alauddin Jani was a governor of Bengal from 1232 until 1233 during the time of Mamluk dynasty.

History
Alauddin assisted Nasiruddin Mahmud to suppress the revolt of Iwaz Khalji in 1227.

In 1232, Alauddin was appointed as the governor of Bengal by the Delhi Sultan Shamsuddin Iltutmish after Balka Khalji was removed from power. Alauddin ruled Bengal only for a year and a few months. He was then succeeded by Saifuddin Aibak.

See also
List of rulers of Bengal
History of Bengal
History of Bangladesh
History of India

References

Governors of Bengal
13th-century Indian Muslims
13th-century Indian monarchs